Isaac Ouwater (1748, Amsterdam – 1793, Amsterdam), was an 18th-century painter of cityscapes from the Northern Netherlands.

Biography
It seems his father was a landscape painter and a widower before when Isaac was born. He was baptized in the Amstelkerk, although his parents had not married yet. The family lived at Prinsengracht, when he married in 1772. He also worked in Haarlem, Delft, Hoorn, Edam and Utrecht.

References

External links
 Isaac Ouwater on RKD
 Isaac Ouwater on Artnet
 Isaac Ouwater at PubHist

1748 births
1793 deaths
18th-century Dutch painters
18th-century Dutch male artists
Dutch male painters
Painters from Amsterdam